The Revenge of the Killer Robots from Hell is a turn-based puzzle game for MS-DOS, programmed by William R. Voss. The full title is displayed in the help screen, but everywhere else is simply referred to as Robots from Hell.

Gameplay 

The gameplay starts with a playing area of a blue grid. The human (white ball) must avoid being captured by the killer robots. The player takes action by avoiding pits and electric fences. Robots can be killed by colliding with an electric fence, but won't fall into pits. The player moves on after reaching the gate without being caught by the killer robots. The player loses points if the human fell into a pit, got electrocuted on an electric fence, or are caught by a killer robot. There are 11 rounds. After 11 rounds, the game ends. There are two modes, Designer boards and Random Boards. The game requires the numeral keypad for making diagonal moves.  The game does not support Roland MT-32. If you select it in sound option, You will get an error message that would read Who do you think I am, Sierra On-Line?

References 

1989 video games
DOS games
Video games developed in the United States
Microsoft games